The 2023 Asia Cup will be the 16th edition of the Asia Cup, with the matches to be played as One Day International with hosts to be announced. The tournament will be played by 6 teams, and is scheduled to be held in September 2023 as a preparatory series before the 2023 Cricket World Cup. Sri Lanka are the defending champions.

The five full members of the Asian Cricket Council will take part in the tournament: Afghanistan, Bangladesh, India, Pakistan and Sri Lanka. They will be joined by the champions of the qualification tournament. In January 2023, the Asian Cricket Council (ACC) announced the pathway structure and calendar for 2023 and 2024, where they confirmed the dates and format of the tournament. Originally, the tournament was scheduled to take place in 2021, but was postponed to 2023 due to packed schedule, with Pakistan as the hosts.

Background 
In June 2020, following a meeting with the ACC, the PCB said they would be willing to let Sri Lanka host the 2020 Asia Cup, with India unwilling to travel to Pakistan. The ACC issued a press release following the meeting stating that "in light of the impact and consequences of the COVID-19 pandemic, possible venue options for the Asia Cup 2020 were discussed and it was decided to take the final decision in due course". In July 2020, an official announcement of the postponement was made by the ACC. The 2020 edition was rescheduled to take place in Sri Lanka in June 2021.

In March 2021, the tournament was at risk of a further postponement after India qualified for the final of the World Test Championship, which clashed with the proposed dates in June. The tournament postponed once again to 2023. In May 2021, the ACC confirmed that there would be no Asia Cup in 2021, with that edition of the tournament deferred until 2023. Pakistan was scheduled to host the 2022 Asia Cup after retaining the rights to host the 2022 edition. However, in October 2021, following a meeting with the ACC, Ramiz Raja confirmed that Pakistan would host the tournament in 2023, with Sri Lanka hosting the 2022 edition.

In October 2022, the BCCI secretary and ACC President Jay Shah said that India wouldn't travel to Pakistan with the ongoing political tension between the two countries. Despite Pakistan being confirmed as hosts earlier, he stated that "the Asia Cup 2023 will be held at a neutral venue." India last toured Pakistan in 2008 for the 2008 Asia Cup. In reply to this statement, the Pakistan Cricket Board (PCB) requested for an emergency meeting of the ACC board to discuss "this important and sensitive matter". The PCB said that this statement could impact on Pakistan's participation in the 2023 CWC and other ICC events in India in the 2024-2031 cycle.

In December 2022, the then PCB chairman Ramiz Raja informed that Pakistan might consider pulling out of this tournament if their hosting rights are withdrawn because of India's unwillingness to travel to Pakistan. However, in January 2023, ACC confirmed the teams and groups of the tournament, with both India and Pakistan taking part.

Format 
The groups and format of the tournament was announced on 5 January 2023, with the six teams split into two groups of three. A total of 13 matches will be played which include six league matches and six Super 4 games. India, Pakistan and a team from qualifier (2023 ACC Men's Challenger Cup - 2023 ACC Men's Premier Cup) have been placed in Group A, while the defending champions Sri Lanka are grouped with Bangladesh and Afghanistan. The top two teams from each of the groups will progress to the Super 4 section of the tournament. From there, the top two teams of the Super 4 section will play each other in the final.

Teams and qualifications

Group stage

Group A 
 Advances to Super Four

Group B 

 Advances to Super Four </onlyinclude>

Controversy 
BCCI refused to go to Pakistan over security concern. However, Pakistan denied to relocate Asia Cup to another venue and threatened to boycott upcoming World cup in India.

References 

Asia Cup
International cricket competitions in 2023

Asia Cup
Asia Cup
International cricket competitions in Pakistan
2023 in Pakistani cricket